Hebe may refer to:

Mythology
 Hebe (mythology), the goddess of youth in Greek mythology

Arts and entertainment
 Hebe (Marvel Comics), a Marvel Comics character
 Cousin Hebe, a character in Gilbert and Sullivan's H.M.S. Pinafore
 Hebe: A Estrela do Brasil, a 2019 Brazilian biographical film
 Hebe, a sculpture by Antonio Canova
 Hebe, a 1964 album by Hebe Camargo
 Hebe, a 1967 album by Hebe Camargo

Ships
 , five Royal Navy vessels
 Hébé-class frigate, a 1781 French frigate class
 French frigate Hébé (1782), lead ship of the class, captured by the British (HMS Hebe)
 USS Hebe (SP-966), a United States Navy patrol boat in commission from 1917 to 1918
 RFA Hebe (A406), a RFA store ship commissioned in 1962
 Hebe (ship), several vessels of that name

People
 Hebe de Bonafini (1928-2022), Argentine activist
 Hebe Camargo (1929–2012), Brazilian television presenter
 Hebe Charlotte Kohlbrugge (1914–2016), Dutch Protestant theologian and Second World War resistance member
 Hebe Tien (born 1983), Taiwanese singer and actress
 Hebe Uhart (1936–2018), Argentine writer
 Hebe Vessuri (born 1942), Argentine social anthropologist

Other uses
 Hebe, a former genus of plants native to New Zealand, now treated as Veronica sect. Hebe
 Hebe Society, a New Zealand botanical organisation
 Hebe, a South Devon Railway Dido class steam locomotive
 Hebe Haven, a harbor in Hong Kong
 Hebe Reef, Tasmania, Australia
 Hebe, an ethnic slur for a Jew
 Shortened form of Hebephilia, a sexual interest in pubescent children
 6 Hebe, a main-belt asteroid
 Veronica sect. Hebe, a garden plant in the Plantago family

See also
 Heeb, a Jewish website